The Link Farm State Archaeological Area (40 HS 6), also known as the Duck River Temple Mounds or Duck River site, is a Mississippian culture archaeological site located at the confluence of the Duck and Buffalo Rivers south of Waverly in Humphreys County, Tennessee. The site is most widely known for the stone artifacts found during excavations in the late 19th century.

Site features
The  site was acquired by the State of Tennessee in 1974 and is now preserved as part of the Johnsonville State Historic Park.

Artifacts

The site is mostly known for being the location where the "Duck River cache" of chert artifacts was discovered in December 1894 in a low hillock at the site. In March 1895 the same but slightly deeper location was also the site of the discovery of a paired male and female set of Mississippian sandstone statues nicknamed "Adam" and "Eve". The male statue is now at the Metropolitan Museum of Art and the female statue has been lost. The Duck River cache was acquired by the McClung Museum of Natural History and Culture in Knoxville, Tennessee and is now on permanent display.

See also
 Angel Mounds
 Annis Mound
 Chucalissa
 Mound Bottom
 Obion Mounds
 Sellars Farm site

References

External links
 Johnsonville State Historic Park Official site
 

Middle Mississippian culture
Archaeological sites in Tennessee
State parks of Tennessee
Protected areas of Humphreys County, Tennessee